Michael Kehlmann (21 September 1927 – 1 December 2005) was an Austrian television film director and theatre director, screenwriter and actor.

During 1951–1953, Kehlmann was the manager of the "Kleines Theater im Konzerthaus", Vienna. He was awarded the J.-Kainz Medal in 1966, the Ehrenmedaille der Stadt Wien in 1966  and the Austrian Honorary Cross for Science and Art in 2002.

Kehlmann's television directing credits included Jack Mortimer,  Einen Jux will er sich machen, Geschichten aus dem Wienerwald, Hiob, and Tatort.

He was the father of writer Daniel Kehlmann.

Credits

Director (Film)
1960: 
1962: Life Begins at Eight
1967: Kurzer Prozess

Director (Television)
1954: Die Wäscherin des Herrn Bonaparte — (based on Madame Sans-Gêne)
1954: Künstlerpech
1954: Jedem die Seine
1954: Klavier zu verkaufen
1955: La Brige und das Gesetz — (based on a play by Georges Courteline)
1955: Die Dynastie hat Ausgang
1955: Falsch verbunden
1955: Unternehmen Hosentasche
1956: Der Verrat von Ottawa — (based on the Gouzenko Affair)
1956: Juno und der Pfau — (based on Juno and the Paycock)
1956: Das gnadenbringende Strafgericht
1957: Die Dreigroschenoper — (based on The Threepenny Opera)
1957: Monsieur Lamberthier — (based on a play by Louis Verneuil)
1957: Der verschwundene Graf
1957: Der versteinerte Wald — (based on The Petrified Forest by Robert E. Sherwood)
1958: Biologie und Tennis — (based on a radio play by Alfred Andersch)
1958: Das Lächeln der Gioconda — (based on The Gioconda Smile)
1958: Eine fast mögliche Geschichte — (based on A Likely Tale by Gerald Savory)
1959:  — (based on Joan of Lorraine)
1959: Kasimir und Karoline — (based on a play by Ödön von Horváth)
1959: Land, das meine Sprache spricht — (based on Der zwanzigste Juli by Alexander Lernet-Holenia)
1959: Es gibt immer drei Möglichkeiten
1960: Der eingebildete Kranke — (based on The Imaginary Invalid)
1960:  — (based on Shadow of Heroes)
1960:  — (based on a play by Ferdinand Bruckner)
1961:  — (based on a play by Ödön von Horváth)
1961: Nora — (based on A Doll's House)
1961:  — (based on I Was Jack Mortimer by Alexander Lernet-Holenia)
1961: Er ging an meiner Seite — (based on Home of the Brave)
1962:  — (based on Einen Jux will er sich machen)
1962: Die Großherzogin von Gerolstein — (based on La Grande-Duchesse de Gérolstein)
1962: Die Besessenen — (based on The Possessed)
1963: Der grüne Kakadu — (based on Der grüne Kakadu by Arthur Schnitzler)
1963: Reporter — (based on The Front Page)
1963:  — (based on Death of a Salesman)
1964: Die Verbrecher — (based on a play by Ferdinand Bruckner)
1964:  — (based on Shout for Life by Terence Feely)
1964: Geschichten aus dem Wienerwald — (based on Tales from the Vienna Woods)
1965:  — (based on Radetzky March)
1965: Plädoyer für einen Rebellen — (based on the play Plaidoyer pour un rebelle by Emmanuel Roblès)
1966: Porträt eines Helden — (based on a novel by Pierre Boulle, adapted by Robert L. Joseph)
1966: Flieger Ross — (based on Ross)
1966: Rette sich, wer kann oder Dummheit siegt überall
1967: Bericht eines Feiglings
1967: Nur kein Cello — (based on The Absence of a Cello by Ira Wallach)
1968: Die Unbekannte aus der Seine — (based on a play by Ödön von Horváth)
1968: Madame Legros — (based on a play by Heinrich Mann)
1968: Sich selbst der Nächste — (based on Are You by Yourself? by Leo Lehman
1968: Schloß in den Wolken — (based on a play by Sam Locke)
1969: Ende eines Leichtgewichts
1969: Das Trauerspiel von Julius Caesar — (based on Julius Caesar)
1969:  (TV series)
1970: Mit sich allein — (based on End of Story by )
1970: Der Kommissar (TV series): Tod eines Klavierspielers
1971: Augenzeugen müssen blind sein — (based on Forget What You Saw by )
1971:  — (screenplay by )
1972: Tatort (TV series): 
1972:  — (based on a play by Egon Kisch)
1972: Der Andersonville-Prozess — (based on The Andersonville Trial by Saul Levitt)
1974:  — (based on a novel by Milo Dor)
1974: Tatort (TV series): 
1974: Telerop 2009 – Es ist noch was zu retten (TV series)
1975: Zahnschmerzen — (screenplay by )
1975: Die weiße Stadt — (based on a novel by Milo Dor)
1977: In freier Landschaft — (screenplay by )
1977: Der Fall Winslow — (based on The Winslow Boy)
1978: Tatort (TV series): 
1978:  (TV miniseries) — (based on Job)
1980: Felix und Oskar (TV series) — (based on The Odd Couple)
1980:  — (based on Der zwanzigste Juli by Alexander Lernet-Holenia)
1981:  — (based on a play by )
1982: Das heiße Herz — (based on the play The Hasty Heart by John Patrick)
1983: Gegenlicht — (based on a novel by )
1983: Mich wundert, daß ich so fröhlich bin — (based on a novel by Johannes Mario Simmel)
1985: Die Flucht ohne Ende — (based on Flight without End)
1986: Tatort (TV series): 
1987: Tatort (TV series): 
1988:  — (based on the Blomberg–Fritsch Affair)
1991: Heldenfrühling
1992: Die Ringe des Saturn — (based on a novel by Peter Zeindler)

Screenwriter
1952: Adventure in Vienna (dir. Emil-Edwin Reinert)

Actor
1952: Adventure in Vienna (dir. Emil-Edwin Reinert), as Passport forger
1953: To Be Without Worries (dir. Georg Marischka)
1975: Die weiße Stadt (dir. Michael Kehlmann)
1982: Tarabas (dir. Michael Kehlmann), as Narrator (voice)
1985: Flucht ohne Ende (dir. Michael Kehlmann), as Narrator (voice)
1987: '38 – Vienna Before the Fall (dir. Wolfgang Glück)

References

External links

Austrian film directors
Austrian television directors
Austrian male screenwriters
Austrian male film actors
German-language film directors
1927 births
2005 deaths
20th-century Austrian screenwriters
20th-century Austrian male writers